Musical Monkey is the fourth album by the Huntington Beach, California, punk rock band Guttermouth, released in 1997 by Nitro Records.

The album peaked at No. 44 on Billboard'''s Heatseekers Albums chart.

Critical reception
The Los Angeles Times determined that Guttermouth's "ridicule of gays, animal-rights zealots, punk rock factionalists and sundry other targets is so over-the-top and scattershot that it obviously is just a prank against social rectitude, an emission not of seething malice but of junior-high-level perversity ... This approach robs Guttermouth of any real satiric bite (which would require moral outrage to buttress the foolery), but the band's raunchy humor in the service of knuckleheadedness does bring some guilty titters." The Illawarra Mercury opined that the band "are masters of the somewhat difficult art of combining social commentary with outrageous satire, and putting it to music that's hard, fast and strangely melodic for punk."

AllMusic wrote: "From Orange County comes a band that reflects all the worst aspects of the Orange County punk scene." OC Weekly deemed the album one of the band's "seminal OC punk records," writing that it "watermark[s] the time and place as well as anything put out during that era." Cincinnati CityBeat'' called "Lipstick" "a vindictive, twisted song—and also weirdly compelling and memorable."

Track listing
All songs written by Guttermouth
"What's the Big Deal?" 1:55
"Lucky the Donkey" 1:43
"Big Pink Dress" 1:23
"Do the Hustle" 2:23
"Good Friday" 1:09
"Baker's Dozen" 2:09
"Abort Mission" 2:11
"Corpse Rotting in Hell" 1:26
"Lipstick" 2:52
"When Hell Freezes Over" 1:19
"S.D.F.B." (Suckin' Dick for Beer) 1:45 
"What If?" 2:25
"Perfect World" 1:53
"Gold" 1:36
"Musical Monkey" 2:00

Performers
Mark Adkins - vocals
Scott Sheldon - guitar
Eric "Derek" Davis - guitar
Steve "Stever" Rapp - bass
James Nunn (aka Captain James T. Nunn) - drums

Album information
Record label: Nitro Records
Recorded at Westbeach Recorders by Donnell Cameron
Mixed at Wesbteach Recorders by Donnell Cameron and Guttermouth
Mastered by Eddie Schrayer at Oasis Mastering

References

Guttermouth albums
Nitro Records albums
1997 albums